Dutch East Indies city Championship was a national amateur football competition in Indonesia held between 1914 and 1930 before the formation of Perserikatan, organized by the PSSI, the Indonesian football federation. The tournament originally featured only the four main cities (Batavia, Soerabaja, Semarang, Bandoeng) but by 1930 included many cities from across the island. Competition in the initiated and organized by the Nederlandsch Indische Voetbal Bond (NIVB) or its successor, the Nederlandsch Indische Voetbal Unie (NIVU) before the Football Association of Indonesia (PSSI) is formed.

History
Starting from 1914, there was a city championship for the main cities on Java. The first seven editions were played for the De Vries beker, which was to be kept outright by the first city to win the tournament five times in total or three times in succession, with Batavia fulfilling both conditions simultaneously when they won on enemy territory in 1920. The tournament originally featured only the four main cities (Batavia, Soerabaja, Semarang, Bandoeng) but by 1930 included many cities from across the island. 

In addition, there were a number of local leagues, lists the following leagues on Java as being controlled by the NIVB (Nederlandsch-Indische Voetbalbond): Batavia (14 clubs), Bandoeng (9 clubs), Soerabaja (12 clubs), Semarang (15 clubs), Malang (8 clubs), Soekaboemi (7 clubs), Djokjakarta (10 clubs); moreover, 3 associations on other islands were subscribed to the NIVB (renamed NIVU in 1936): East Sumatra (based in Medan), Makassar and Bandjermasin. In addition the Hwa Nan FA (based in Semarang), presumably an ethnic Chinese association, was subscribed.

List of Dutch East Indies city champions
It's the list of the DEI Championship winner since 1914 until 1950.

City Championship

Oost Sumatra

Eerste Klasse

Inlandsche Competitive

Batavia

Eerste Klasse

Tweede Klasse

Bandoeng

Eerste Klasse

Tweede Klasse

Vijfjarig jubileum B.V.B. (Bandoeng Voetbal Bond)

Soekaboemi
Eerste Klasse

Soerabaja

Eerste Klasse

External links 
 Official website of Liga Indonesia
 Official website of PSSI
 List of Indonesian Football Champions

References

Defunct football leagues in Indonesia
Sports leagues established in 1914
1914 establishments in the Dutch East Indies
1950 disestablishments in Indonesia
Sport in the Dutch East Indies